The Acre River (called Aquiry in the local Iñapari language; locally, Rio Acre) is a  long river in central South America.

Course
The river is born in Peru, and runs North-Eastwards, forming part of the border between Peru and Brazil and then part of the border between Bolivia and Brazil. It runs through the Brazilian states of Acre and Amazonas, before eventually running into the Purus River at Boca do Acre. It runs along  the Bolivian frontier and flows northeastward to a junction with the Purus at 8° 45' South latitude. The name is also applied to a district situated on the same river and on the former boundary line of 1867, between Bolivia and Brazil.

It is navigable from the mouth until the Xapuri River, even farther in the wet season from January until May.  The river was an important transportation artery at the end of the 19th century due to newly discovered rubber tree forests.

The Rio Acre Ecological Station lies in the municipalities of Assis Brasil and Sena Madureira in the state of Acre, Brazil. 
It contains Amazon forest bounded to the north by an Indian reservation and to the south by the Acre River.
It was created to preserve the headwaters of the Acre River.

History

The region was settled by Peruvians between 1870 and 1878, but was invaded by Brazilian rubber collectors during the next decade (during the 'rubber boom') and became tributary to the rubber markets of Iquitos, Manaus and Pará. In 1899, the Bolivian government established a custom-house at Puerto Alonso, on the Acre river, for the collection of export duties on rubber, which precipitated a conflict with the Brazilian settlers, and finally brought about a boundary dispute between the two republics. In July 1899 the "Acreanos" declared their independence and set up a republic of their own, but in the following March they were reduced to submission by Brazil. Various disorders followed until Brazil decided to occupy Puerto Alonso with a military force. The boundary dispute was finally settled at Petropolis on November 17, 1903, through the purchase by Brazil of the rubber-producing territory, south to about the ninth parallel.

References

Rivers of Amazonas (Brazilian state)
Rivers of Acre (state)
Rivers of Peru
Rivers of Madre de Dios Region
Rivers of Pando Department
Bolivia–Brazil border
Brazil–Peru border
International rivers of South America
Tributaries of the Amazon River
Border rivers